Buoyant density centrifugation (also isopycnic centrifugation or equilibrium density-gradient centrifugation) uses the concept of buoyancy to separate molecules in solution by their differences in density.

Implementation
Historically a caesium chloride (CsCl) solution was often used, but more commonly used density gradients are sucrose or Percoll. The sample is put on top of the solution, and then the tube is spun at a very high speed for an extended time, at times lasting days. The CsCl molecules become densely packed toward the bottom, so even layers of different densities form.  Since the original solution was approximately the same density, they go to a level where their density and the CsCl density are the same, to which they form a sharp, distinctive band.

Isotope separation
This method very sharply separates molecules, and is so sharp that it can even separate different molecular isotopes from one another.

DNA separation
Buoyant density of majority of DNA is 1.7g/cm3 which is equal to density of 6M CsCl solution. Buoyant density of DNA changes with its GC content. The term "satellite DNA" refers to small bands of repetitive DNA sequences with distinct base composition floating above (A+T rich) or below (G+C rich) the main component DNA.

See also
Isopycnic
 Satellite DNA

References

Further reading

Separation processes
Laboratory techniques